Wayne Arthurson is a Canadian writer from Alberta. He is the  author of several novels and several books related to First Nations peoples. His parents are of Cree and French Canadian descent. He grew up on an army base.

Arthurson's first novel, Final Season, published in 2002, is set in a First Nations community that faces profound environmental change, due to a new hydroelectric project.

Arthurson has two mystery series with the recurring hero Leo Desroches, a metis journalist, who has had his own run-ins with the law. Fall from Grace was published in 2011, A Killing Winter was published in 2012, and Blood Red Summer was published in 2015.  

His second series starts with Dishonour in Camp 133 is set in a POW camp for captured Germans, in Alberta. 

The hero of Arthurson's sixth novel, The Red Chesterfield, published in 2019, is "M", a by-law enforcement officer.

Bibliography

References

Writers from Alberta
Living people
Year of birth missing (living people)